Michael James (September 12, 1861 – April 27, 1943) was a Canadian politician, who represented the electoral district of Nipissing East in the Legislative Assembly of Ontario from 1902 to 1904.

A member of the Liberal Party, he was elected in the 1902 election.

James was born in Centreville, Ontario in 1861. He died in 1943 at age 81.

References

External links

1861 births
1943 deaths
Ontario Liberal Party MPPs
People from Mattawa, Ontario